Sir William Gammie Ogg FRSE LLD (1891–1979) was a British horticultural scientist and Director of Rothamsted Experimental Station

Life
He was born at Craigbank Farm in Peterculter near Aberdeen on 2 November 1891 the son of James Ogg and his wife, Janet Gammie. He was educated at Robert Gordon's College in Aberdeen then studied Science at the University of Aberdeen specialising in Chemistry. He graduated MA in 1912 then took a further degree in Agriculture gaining a BSc in 1913.

In the First World War he worked as a chemist at the explosives factory at Oldbury and at Greetland in Yorkshire. After the war, in 1924, he began working as an Advisory Officer at the East Of Scotland College of Agriculture. In 1925 he was elected a Fellow of the Royal Society of Edinburgh. His proposers were Alexander Lauder, Sir James Walker, George Barger and Ralph Allan Sampson.

In 1930, he went to the Macaulay Institute in Aberdeen as its Director. In 1943 he moved to Rothamsted Experimental Station. His colleagues there included Douglas M. C. MacEwan FRSE.

He was knighted by King George VI in 1949.

He served as President of the Chemistry Institute of Great Britain 1953 to 1955.

He retired in 1958 and died at Arnhall in Edzell, Angus on 25 September 1979. He is buried in Edzell Churchyard.

Family
In 1922 he married Helen Hilbert.

References 

1891 births
1979 deaths
People educated at Robert Gordon's College
Alumni of the University of Aberdeen
Fellows of the Royal Society of Edinburgh
British horticulturists